Richard Vincent Comerford, known generally as Vincent Comerford, is a professor of Irish history at the National University of Ireland, Maynooth who retired in January 2010. Comerford graduated from St. Patrick's College, (NUI) Maynooth, BA(1965) and MA (1971), followed by a PhD from Trinity College Dublin in 1977. He was appointed Professor of Modern History at Maynooth in 1989. 

He is on the consultative committee of the Irish Historical Society, a board member of the Irish Research Council for the Humanities and Social Sciences (IRCHSS). and principal investigator at the Associational Culture in Ireland Database.

Bibliography
 Charles J. Kickham: A Study in Irish Nationalism and Literature (Dublin: Wolfhound 1979)
 The Fenians in context: Irish politics and society 1848–82 (Dublin, 1985)
 The National Question (2000)
 Ireland  Inventing the Nation Bloomsbury Academic (2003) Arnold, London (2003)

Co-authored books
 Irishness in a Changing Society Monaco; The Princess Grace Irish Library (1989), chapter 1 - R.V. Comerford, Political Myths In Modern Ireland.
 Religion, Conflict and Coexistence in Ireland by R.V. Comerford, Mary Cullen, Jacqueline Hill, and Colm Lennon (1990)

Dedicated book
 Ireland's Polemical Past; Views of Irish History in honour of RV Comerford ed. T. Dooley; University College Dublin Press (2010)

References

20th-century Irish historians
21st-century Irish historians
Living people
Irish non-fiction writers
Irish male non-fiction writers
Irish political scientists
Academics of Maynooth University
Academics of St Patrick's College, Maynooth
Alumni of St Patrick's College, Maynooth
Year of birth missing (living people)